Nosophora insignis is a moth in the family Crambidae. It was described by Arthur Gardiner Butler in 1881. It is found in Japan and China.

References

Moths described in 1881
Spilomelinae
Moths of Japan
Moths of Asia